Dubki is a rural locality (a selo) in Razdolyevskoye Rural Settlement, Kolchuginsky District, Vladimir Oblast, Russia. The population was 104 as of 2010. There are 3 streets.

Geography 
Dubki is located 15 km southeast of Kolchugino (the district's administrative centre) by road. Dubki (settlement) is the nearest rural locality.

References 

Rural localities in Kolchuginsky District